Kelcie Lee Anne Hedge (born September 19, 1997) is an American professional soccer player who plays as a midfielder for National Women's Soccer League (NWSL) club Houston Dash.

Club career 
OL Reign selected Hedge with the ninth overall pick in the 2020 NWSL College Draft, and she signed a three-year contract with the team on March 6, 2020. However, Hedge suffered an ACL injury on July 1 and subsequently missed the entire season.

Hedge made her professional debut on July 18, 2021.

She was traded to Houston Dash in December 2021.

International career 
Hedge is a United States youth international and played at the 2016 FIFA U-20 Women's World Cup.

References

External links 
 
 Santa Clara profile
 Washington profile

Washington Huskies women's soccer players
Santa Clara Broncos women's soccer players
OL Reign draft picks
OL Reign players
Living people
1997 births
Women's association football midfielders
Soccer players from Idaho
People from Post Falls, Idaho
United States women's under-20 international soccer players
National Women's Soccer League players
American women's soccer players
Houston Dash players